The Treason Act 1442 (20 Hen.6 c.3) was an Act of the Parliament of England. It made it high treason for any Welshman to "drive, bring, carry away, or withhold" any Englishman or any Englishman's horse, cattle or goods. The Act was due to expire after six years, but was renewed for a further six years by the Act 27 Hen.6 c.4 (1448), after which it was allowed to expire.

See also
High treason in the United Kingdom
Treason Act

References

Treason in England
Acts of the Parliament of England
1440s in law
1442 in England